January 17 - Eastern Orthodox liturgical calendar - January 19

All fixed commemorations below are observed on January 31 by Eastern Orthodox Churches on the Old Calendar.

For January 18th, Orthodox Churches on the Old Calendar commemorate the Saints listed on January 5.

Saints
 Martyr Theodula of Anazarbus in Cilicia (c. 304)
 Martyrs Helladius, Theodoulos, Boethius, Evagrius, and Macarius, of Anazarbus in Cilicia (c. 304)
 Martyr Xenia, by fire.
 Saint Athanasius the Great, Archbishop of Alexandria (373)
 Venerable Marcian of Cyrrhus, monk, in Syria (c. 388)
 Saint Cyril of Alexandria, Archbishop of Alexandria (444)
 Venerable Ephraimios, Bishop of Mylasa, in Caria (5th century)
 Venerable Sylvanus of Palestine, the ascetic.

Pre-Schism Western saints
 Virgin-martyr Prisca, venerated from ancient times in Rome, where a church is dedicated to her on the Aventine (1st or 3rd century)
 Martyrs Archelais, Thecla and Susanna, three holy virgins, at Salerno (293)  (see also: June 6)
 Saint Volusianus of Tours, a married senator who was chosen Bishop of Tours in France and shortly after driven out by Arian Visigoths (496)
 Saint Liberata of Como, a holy virgin in Como in Italy where with her sister St Faustina she founded the convent of Santa Margarita (580)
 Saint Leobardus of Marmoutier in Gaul, hermit (593)
 Saint Ninnidh of Inismacsaint, Ireland (6th century)  (see also: January 17)
 Saint Deicolus, one of the twelve disciples to accompany St. Columbanus in his missionary enterprise (625)
 Saint Ulfrid (Wolfred, Wulfrid, Wilfrid), missionary in Germany and Sweden, martyred for destroying an image of Thor (1028)

Post-Schism Orthodox saints
 Venerable Ephraim the Lesser (the Philosopher) of Georgia (1101)
 Venerable Cyril, Igumen at Kiev (1146)
 Saint Joachim, Patriarch of Turnovo (1248)
 Saints Cyril, Schemamonk, and Maria, Schemanun (both c. 1337), parents of St. Sergius of Radonezh.
 Saint Maximus of Serbia, Archbishop of Wallachia (1516)
 Venerable Athanasius of Syandemsk, Abbot of Syandemsk (Valaam and Vologda) (1550)
 Venerable Athanasius of Navolotsk, Fool-for-Christ (16th-17th centuries)
 Saint Alexis (Shushania), Hieromonk of Teklati, Georgia (1923)

New martyrs and confessors
 New Hieromartyr Michael Kargopolov, Priest (1919)
 New Hieromartyr Eugene Isadsky, Priest (1930)
 New Hieromartyr Vladimir Zubkovich, Archpriest of Smolevichi (Belorussia) (1937)
 New Hieromartyrs Nicholas Krasovsky, Sergius Lebedev, Alexander Rousinov, Priests (1938)

Icon gallery

Notes

References

Sources
 January 18/January 31. Orthodox Calendar (PRAVOSLAVIE.RU).
 January 31 / January 18. HOLY TRINITY RUSSIAN ORTHODOX CHURCH (A parish of the Patriarchate of Moscow).
 January 18. OCA - The Lives of the Saints.
 The Autonomous Orthodox Metropolia of Western Europe and the Americas (ROCOR). St. Hilarion Calendar of Saints for the year of our Lord 2004. St. Hilarion Press (Austin, TX). p. 8.
 January 18. Latin Saints of the Orthodox Patriarchate of Rome.
 The Roman Martyrology. Transl. by the Archbishop of Baltimore. Last Edition, According to the Copy Printed at Rome in 1914. Revised Edition, with the Imprimatur of His Eminence Cardinal Gibbons. Baltimore: John Murphy Company, 1916. pp. 18–19.
Greek Sources
 Great Synaxaristes:  18 ΙΑΝΟΥΑΡΙΟΥ. ΜΕΓΑΣ ΣΥΝΑΞΑΡΙΣΤΗΣ.
  Συναξαριστής. 18 Ιανουαρίου. ECCLESIA.GR. (H ΕΚΚΛΗΣΙΑ ΤΗΣ ΕΛΛΑΔΟΣ). 
Russian Sources
  31 января (18 января). Православная Энциклопедия под редакцией Патриарха Московского и всея Руси Кирилла (электронная версия). (Orthodox Encyclopedia - Pravenc.ru).
  18 января (ст.ст.) 31 января 2013 (нов. ст.). Русская Православная Церковь Отдел внешних церковных связей. (DECR).

January in the Eastern Orthodox calendar